Aabyhøj , or Åbyhøj, is a neighborhood of Aarhus, Denmark. It is part of the postal district of Aarhus V and has a population of approximately 11,000 people and is home to Aabyhøj IF football club and Aabyhøj Basketball.

History
Aabyhøj literally means Aaby-hill and the name reflects that it sprawled on the hillsides of the old village of Aaby at the Aarhus River. Aabyhøj comprise relatively modern buildings from or after the Industrial Revolution, but the old village charm can still be seen around Aaby, at the river banks in the southeast of Aabyhøj.

Gallery

Notable people
Just Betzer, film producer
Niels Brinck, singer-songwriter
Tina Dickow, singer-songwriter and guitarist
Jacob Vinjegaard
Hans Ranum
Frederik Krabbe, football player

See also 
 Åbyhøj Church
 Aaby
 Aarhus V

References

External links 

Aarhus V
Neighborhoods of Aarhus